The 1973 Wisconsin Badgers football team represented the University of Wisconsin–Madison in the 1973 Big Ten Conference football season.

Schedule

Personnel

Season summary

Ohio State

1974 NFL Draft

References

Wisconsin
Wisconsin Badgers football seasons
Wisconsin Badgers football